Daniel Castillo Durante is an Argentine/Quebecois author and a professor at the University of Ottawa. He was cowinner with Paul Savoie of the Trillium Book Award for French-language work in 2006, for his book La Passion des nomades.

References

External links 
 Daniel Castillo Durante page at the University of Ottawa

Argentine writers in French
Canadian people of Argentine descent
Writers from Quebec
Academic staff of the University of Ottawa
Canadian novelists in French
21st-century Argentine male writers
21st-century Canadian male writers
Canadian non-fiction writers in French
Canadian short story writers in French
21st-century Canadian novelists
21st-century Canadian non-fiction writers
21st-century Canadian short story writers
Canadian male novelists
Canadian male non-fiction writers
Canadian male short story writers
Writers from Ottawa
Year of birth missing (living people)
Living people
Place of birth missing (living people)